Marhamat is a town in Andijan Region, Uzbekistan. It is the administrative center of Marhamat District. Its population was 11,055 in 1989, and 13,600 in 2016.

References

Populated places in Andijan Region
Cities in Uzbekistan